Sheykh Safi Station ( – Īstgāh-e Sheykh Şafī and Īstgāh-e Sheykh Şafī) is a village and railway station in Owch Tappeh-ye Gharbi Rural District, Torkamanchay District, Meyaneh County, East Azerbaijan Province, Iran. At the 2006 census, its population was 23, in 4 families.

References 

Populated places in Meyaneh County
Railway stations in Iran